James Shelton was an American Broadway actor, composer, and writer. He is best known for being the songwriter of "Lilac Wine" (1950), which has been covered by numerous artists.

Musicals and revues
New Faces of 1934, produced by Leonard Sillman. Music by James Shelton with Henry Fonda, March 15, 1934 – July 1934
Who's Who, March 1, 1938 – March 1938
The Straw Hat Revue, September 29, 1939 – December 2, 1939
Dance Me a Song, January 20, 1950 – February 18, 1950
Mrs Patterson, December 1, 1954 – February 26, 1955
Almost Crazy,  music by James Shelton, June 20, 1955 – July 2, 1955

References

Year of birth missing
American male songwriters